Cacotherapia unicoloralis is a species of snout moth in the genus Cacotherapia. It was described by William Barnes and James Halliday McDunnough in 1913 and is known from the US state of Florida.

References

Cacotherapiini
Moths described in 1913